The Solomon Islands national badminton team represents Solomon Islands in international badminton team competitions and is administered by the Solomon Islands National Badminton Federation, the governing body for badminton in Solomon Islands headquartered in Honiara.

The Solomon Islands competed in the 2022 Pacific Mini Games. The team finished in 6th place in the group round-robin tie.

Participation in Pacific Mini Games
Mixed team

Current squad 
The following players were selected to represent the Solomon Islands at the 2022 Pacific Mini Games.

Male players
Joseph Taupiri
Rodney Vaka
Jeffery Kalia
Joseph Matiota

Female players
Catherine Temete
Emma Soaki
Elizabeth Meke
Norah Meke

References

https://northernmarianas2022.com/badminton/

National badminton teams
National sports teams of the Solomon Islands